University of Windsor Stadium, also known as Alumni Field, South Campus Stadium and St. Denis Centre Stadium, is a 2,000-seat stadium located in Windsor, Ontario, Canada. The stadium is mainly used for soccer and Canadian football. It is home to the Windsor Lancers, the athletic teams of the University of Windsor.  

The stadium was built in conjunction with the City of Windsor to host the 2005 Pan American Junior Athletics Championships. The total project cost $8.6 million and was built by Eastern Construction and designed by JP Thomson Associates Ltd. The stadium opened in June 2005.

The stadium is next to the St. Denis Athletic Centre.

A FieldTurf playing surface was added to the stadium after a fundraising initiative, including a large donation of $500,000 from the University of Windsor Alumni Association. At the time, this donation was the largest gift ever in the organization's history.

The 2007 Canadian Soccer League (CSL) All-star game was held at University of Windsor Stadium.

It was host to the 2007 Canadian Track and Field Championships and the 2008 Canadian Track and Field Trials.

Sources

External links

Windsor Lancers

Sports venues in Windsor, Ontario
Soccer venues in Ontario
Canadian football venues in Ontario
Athletics (track and field) venues in Ontario
Multi-purpose stadiums in Canada
2005 establishments in Ontario
Sports venues completed in 2005